The Ribose repressor (RbsR) is a bacterial DNA-binding transcription repressor protein and a member of the LacI/GalR protein family.  In Escherichia coli, RbsR is responsible for regulation of genes involved in D-ribose metabolism.  In Bacillus subtilis, RbsR was shown to interact with Histidine-containing protein (HPr), an allosteric effector of the related LacI/GalR protein Catabolite Control Protein A (CcpA).

External links 
RbsR in EcoGene
RbsR in EColiWiki

References 

Bacterial proteins
Gene expression